Finland competed at the 2004 Summer Olympics in Athens, Greece, from 13 to 29 August 2004. Finnish athletes have competed at every Olympic Games since its debut in 1908. The Finnish Olympic Committee (SO) sent the nation's smallest ever team to the Games after the 1932 Summer Olympics in Los Angeles. A total of 53 athletes, 36 men and 17 women, competed only in 12 sports; the nation's team size was roughly denser from Sydney by a quarter of the athletes.

The Finnish team featured three returning Olympic medalists from Sydney: Greco-Roman wrestler Marko Yli-Hannuksela, rifle shooter Juha Hirvi, who won a silver in the men's rifle three positions, and competed at his fifth Olympic Games, and open skiff sailor and defending Olympic champion Thomas Johanson, who was appointed by the committee to carry the Finnish flag in the opening ceremony. Other notable Finnish athletes included swimmers Hanna-Maria Seppälä and 1996 Olympic silver medalist Jani Sievinen, professional tennis player Jarkko Nieminen, javelin thrower and top medal contender Tero Pitkämäki, and hammer thrower Olli-Pekka Karjalainen.

Finland left Athens with their worst athletic performance, as the Finns failed to pick up a single gold for the first time in the entire Olympic history. Two silver medals were awarded to the Finnish team for skeet shooter Marko Kemppainen, and Greco-Roman wrestler Marko Yli-Hannuksela, who had previously won a bronze from Sydney in the men's 74 kg category.

Medalists

Archery 

One Finnish archer qualified for the women's individual archery.

Athletics 

Finnish athletes have so far achieved qualifying standards in the following athletics events (up to a maximum of 3 athletes in each event at the 'A' Standard, and 1 at the 'B' Standard).

Men
Track & road events

Field events

Combined events – Decathlon

Women
Track & road events

Field events

Combined events – Heptathlon

Badminton

Canoeing

Sprint

Qualification Legend: Q = Qualify to final; q = Qualify to semifinal

Diving 

Finnish divers qualified for two individual spots at the 2004 Olympic Games.

Men

Judo

Finland has qualified a single judoka.

Sailing

Finnish sailors have qualified one boat for each of the following events.

Women

Open

M = Medal race; OCS = On course side of the starting line; DSQ = Disqualified; DNF = Did not finish; DNS= Did not start; RDG = Redress given

Shooting 

Six Finnish shooters (four men and two women) qualified to compete in the following events:

Men

Women

Swimming 

Finnish swimmers earned qualifying standards in the following events (up to a maximum of 2 swimmers in each event at the A-standard time, and 1 at the B-standard time):

Men

Women

Taekwondo

Finland has qualified a single taekwondo jin.

Tennis

Finland nominated one male tennis player to compete in the tournament.

Wrestling 

Men's Greco-Roman

See also
 Finland at the 2004 Summer Paralympics

References

External links
Official Report of the XXVIII Olympiad
Finnish Olympic Committee  

Nations at the 2004 Summer Olympics
2004
Summer Olympics